Dubbeldam may refer to:

 Dubbeldam, a former town in the Netherlands that merged into Dordrecht in 1970
 Jeroen Dubbeldam (born 1973), Dutch equestrian, Olympic Champion
 Ellen Dubbeldam-Kuipers (born 1971), Dutch hockey player, Olympic Bronze medalist
 Winka Dubbeldam (born 1966), Dutch-born American architect